The 2006–07 Segunda División season (known this season as the Liga BBVA for sponsorship reasons) was the 76th since its establishment. The first matches of the season were played on 27 August 2006, and the season ended on 17 June 2007. Alavés, Cádiz and Málaga were the teams which were relegated from La Liga the previous season. Las Palmas, Salamanca, Ponferradina, and Vecindario were the teams which were promoted from Segunda División B the previous season.

Teams 
The 2006–07 Segunda División was made up of the following teams:

League table

Results

Top goal scorers 
Last updated June 17, 2007

Teams by autonomous community

See also 
 List of transfers of Segunda División – 2006–07 season

References 
 

 
Segunda División seasons
2
Spain